Adrian Ungur became the first champion of this event, after won against Albert Ramos-Viñolas 6–4, 6–4 in the final.

Seeds

Draw

Final four

Top half

Bottom half

References
 Main Draw
 Qualifying Draw

Sicilia Classic Mancuso Company Cup - Singles
Sicilia Classic